Francis Joseph Steingass (March 16, 1825, Frankfurt am Main – January 1903) was a British linguist and orientalist of German Jewish descent.

Biography
Steingass completed his education, including a Ph.D., in Munich, Germany. Later, he was professor of Modern Languages at Birmingham, Professor of Modern Languages and Resident Lecturer on Arabic Languages, Literature & Law at the Oriental Institute, Woking.

He mastered 14 languages, including Arabic, Persian and Sanskrit. He published a number of Persian-English, Arabic-English and English-Arabic dictionaries.

Works

Author
  Another digitised copy is here.
 
 Apparently there is a 2015 edition from Munshiram Manoharlal Publishers, New Delhi, .

Translator, editor
 The Assemblies of Al-Ḥarîri. Translated from the Arabic with Notes Historical and Grammatical (1898), vol. 2 (the last 24 Assemblies), trans. from Arabic by and F. Steingass, preface & index by F. F. Arbuthnot, Oriental Translation Fund, New Series, 3 (London: Royal Asiatic Society), 2nd of 2 vols, the 1st with the first 24 Assemblies being published in 1867 with a trans. by Thomas Chenery.

References

External links 
 University of Chicago - Digital Dictionaries of South Asia: Steingass, Francis Joseph. A Comprehensive Persian-English dictionary, including the Arabic words and phrases to be met with in Persian literature. London: Routledge & K. Paul, 1892.

1825 births
1903 deaths
British Arabists
British lexicographers
British orientalists
Linguists from the United Kingdom
Linguists from Germany
19th-century lexicographers